Stevens Peak is a  mountain summit in the Tatoosh Range which is a sub-range of the Cascade Range. It's located in Mount Rainier National Park, one mile east of Unicorn Peak. The name honors Hazard Stevens who made the first documented ascent of Mount Rainier along with P. B. Van Trump on August 17, 1870. The mountain's name was officially adopted in 1913. Precipitation runoff from the mountain drains into tributaries of the Cowlitz River.

Climate

Stevens Peak is located in the marine west coast climate zone of western North America. Most weather fronts originate in the Pacific Ocean, and travel northeast toward the Cascade Mountains. As fronts approach, they are forced upward by the peaks of the Cascade Range (Orographic lift), causing them to drop their moisture in the form of rain or snowfall onto the Cascades. As a result, the west side of the North Cascades experiences high precipitation, especially during the winter months in the form of snowfall. Due to its temperate climate and proximity to the Pacific Ocean, areas west of the Cascade Crest very rarely experience temperatures below  or above . During winter months, weather is usually cloudy, but, due to high pressure systems over the Pacific Ocean that intensify during summer months, there is often little or no cloud cover during the summer. Because of maritime influence, snow tends to be wet and heavy, resulting in high avalanche danger.

References

External links

 National Park Service web site: Mount Rainier National Park
 Weather forecast: Stevens Peak

Cascade Range
Mountains of Lewis County, Washington
Mountains of Washington (state)
North American 2000 m summits